Beatrice Bocci (born 8 April 1970) is an Italian showgirl, beauty pageant winner and television presenter. In 1994 she was crowned Miss Tuscany and later placed first runner-up at Miss Italia 1994. She has hosted the shows  Su le mani and Va ora in onda both on RAI 1.

References

Living people
1970 births
Italian female models
Italian showgirls